"Body Moves" is a song by American band DNCE. It was released through Republic Records as the lead single from their self-titled debut studio album on September 30, 2016. The band's lead singer, Joe Jonas, wrote the song with Rami Yacoub, Albin Nedler, and Kristoffer Fogelmark, all three of whom co-produced the track.

Critical reception
Robbie Daw of Idolator commented on the influence of Justin Timberlake's solo debut, Justified (2002), on the track's sound and wrote that "Body Moves" is "a tune that's not only a worth follow-up... but actually manages to top both of its successors."

Music videos
The promotional music video set to the song premiered October 5, 2016 which also doubled as an advertisement for a line of Victoria's Secret lingerie, the video includes models Taylor Hill, Elsa Hosk, Jasmine Tookes, Sara Sampaio and Josephine Skriver. The official music video for "Body Moves" was directed by Hannah Lux Davis and premiered October 11, 2016. Described by critics as "provocative," the video finds Joe Jonas shirtless and engaging in sexual behaviour with model Charlotte McKinney in an elevator, amongst other clips of the band members and "barely clothed" dancers.

Live performances
DNCE appeared on The Today Show on August 26, 2016 and performed "Body Moves", along with "Cake by the Ocean" and "Toothbrush".

Credits and personnel
 Recording engineer – Noah "Mailbox" Passovoy
 Background vocalist, drums, guitar, programmer, recording engineer, producer, lyricist, composer – Kristoffer Fogelmark
 Background vocalist, programmer, recording engineer, producer, lyricist, composer – Albin Nedler
 Mixer – Serban Ghenea
 Engineer – John Hanes
 Programmer, recording engineer, producer, lyricist, composer – Rami Yacoub
 Background vocalist, drums – Jack Lawless
 Background vocalist, bass – Cole Whittle
 Background vocalist, guitar – JinJoo Lee
 Vocalist, lyricist, composer – Joe Jonas
 Horn arranger, saxophones – Jonas Thander
 Trombone – Staffan Findin
 Trumpet – Stefan Persson
 Trumpet – Patrik Skogh
 Lyricist, composer – Justin Tranter

Chart performance

Weekly Charts

Year-end Charts

Release history

References

2016 singles
2016 songs
DNCE songs
Funk rock songs
Republic Records singles
Music videos directed by Hannah Lux Davis
Song recordings produced by Rami Yacoub
Songs written by Joe Jonas
Songs written by Rami Yacoub
Songs written by Justin Tranter
Songs written by Kristoffer Fogelmark
Songs written by Albin Nedler